The Incredible Crash Dummies is a line of action figures designed by David McDonald and Jim Byrne, styled after the eponymous
crash test dummy popularized in a public service advertising campaign of the late 1980s, to educate people on the safety of wearing seat belts.  The toys were first released by Tyco Toys in the early 1990s and discontinued in 1994. From 2004 on, a new series of animated shorts involving the crash dummies was produced and the action figures subsequently revived under the Hot Wheels brand, another subdivision of Mattel.

Main features 
The Crash Dummies are anthropomorphic action figures modeled after the mannequins used in automobile collision simulations. Each one generally has two "impact buttons" on their torsos that, when pushed, will spring their limbs from their bodies.

The toys mostly focused on a single body type, which featured two chest buttons- the top button caused the head and arms to separate, and the bottom button forced the legs to come off. Each arm and leg could also be separated further. This body type did have problems, however, in that the small metal clips inside the bodies which held the limbs on would sometimes break. Further, the tabs which held the limbs on the bodies were made from an unreliable plastic and, thus, were prone to breakage. Other bodies, however, focused on character-specific features and, while retaining the removable limbs (each would pull off at the midpoint), the button would activate some other feature (i.e. Daryl's spinning head, Spare Tire's "bug-out" eyes, ears, and tongue).

A set of vehicles was also released which could then be used to simulate the car crashes as seen in the ads of the original crash test dummies. Among others, these vehicles include cars, jeeps, motorcycles and even airplanes. Each toy can be destroyed in a similar manner as the Crash Dummies themselves and can then later be reassembled. Vehicles come equipped with appropriate safety features such as helmets, airbags, and working seatbelts to promote saving lives through their use.

History

Generation 1: Vince & Larry (Early 1991) 
The original line of Crash Dummy toys centered on the National Highway Traffic Safety Administration's Vince and Larry "spokes-dummies" and other characters. The concept and initial play pattern for action figures and crash cars evolved through collaboration of Brian Dyak and Lawrence Scot Deutchman of the Entertainment Industries Council, Inc. as a key component of a national cause oriented marketing campaign designed by them and Leisure Concepts Ltd. Mr. Dyak and Mr. Deutchman hold the original inventor rights. However, licensing rights were given to Leisure Concepts and subsequently Tyco Toys shared in ownership. The campaign successfully went beyond the traditional television and radio public service announcements to give children and parents a hands on experience to learn the message "buckle up".  Dummy suits used the characteristic solid colors and "caution" checkered stripes. The first generation was called "Vince & Larry, The Crash Dummies". Each toy was accompanied with a personalized biography card explaining the characteristics of each character. The first generation figures had the slogan "You Could Learn A Lot From A Dummy, Buckle Your Safety Belt!". After the first generation the slogan changed to "Don't You Be A Dummy. Buckle Your Safety Belt!". Later on as the characters developed, this line was added by the dummies saying, "And leave the crashing to us!" Deutchman developed the original style guide and Dyak led negotiations with the National Highway Traffic Safety Administration, eventually resulting in the flexibility to expand the line by discontinuing the relationship with the government. This catapulted the toy line into the popular culture as Leisure Concepts secured over fifty licensed properties on behalf of the campaign, including a Saturday morning television special.

The bright primary color packaging with what would become the trademark neon orange accented designs were executed for Tyco by Howard Temner Design of New York, who contracted veteran toy and video game illustrator Marc Ericksen to do the myriad illustrations that would be featured throughout the production run of these popular toys. This team worked together with Tyco on all the following toy sets, from Vince and Larry, all the way through the Junk Bot series and their various iterations, eventually including their licensed uses for video game applications.

Generation 2: The Incredible Crash Dummies (late 1991–1992)
The Incredible Crash Dummies saw a departure from the NHTSA dummies after three major networks banned the PSA commercials on airwaves in fear of promotion of Tyco's line of toys. This led to the end of the Vince and Larry action figures and namesake and the creation of a specific set of new heroes, Slick and Spin. Other characters carried over from the original series included Daryl, Spare Tire, and Hubcat & Bumper, the crash test cat and dog. However, all sets were re-branded with the new logos and characters. All artwork and images on the packages remained the same, with the names of Vince and Larry painted out in every photo. Each character came equipped with his own accessories and special ability to spring apart. Others had customized vehicles to drive around in. The Crash Dummies' profession is to educate children on the dangers of traffic and the hazards of driving without a seat belt. According to the backstory, they spend their time at the Crash Test Facility improving safety of automobiles by means of elaborate crash simulations. The backstory of Slick and Spin is identical to Vince & Larry's, as are their artwork with a palette swap. Axel (Green suit with glasses), Dash (Yellow suit with bulls eye on forehead), Wack (Red shirt with suspenders, blue pants and blue cap), Flip (Black and yellow suit), and J.R. (Red and gray suit) are only included with vehicles and could not be purchased separately, giving them a high rarity. By "The Incredible" era, the line had gained mainstream popularity in the US and Europe, and quickly became a target for angry letters from parents. Many questioned the glorification of car crashes, while others protested the removal of Skid the Kid and Hubcat/Bumper from stores, which eventually happened.

Generation 3: Pro-Tek Suits (1993)
The Junkbots were created as the primary antagonists to the Crash Dummies. They are four ruthless killing machines - the sinister leader Junkman and his henchmen Piston Head, Jack Hammer and Sideswipe - bent on destroying the Crash Dummies. Contrary to the original toys the Junkbots could not be blown apart (though parts were still removable), and they were mainly equipped with weapons intended to activate the triggers on the Crash Dummies' bodies. The junkbots were also supplied with their own set of vehicles, including a snow plower, a cannon and a chopper styled motorcycle. In this generation the Crash Dummies were released with bright colors, supposedly wearing "Pro-Tek" uniforms that made them stronger and faster. Three new dummies are originally released, Bull, who is presented as a friend to Spare Tire, and Dent & Chip, two brothers who always sport giant smiles and have gashes in their skulls, exposing pieces of brain. Each action figure comes with a weapon or tool to fight the Junkbots. In addition the Crash Go-Kart, Crash ATV, and Crash Lawn Mower were re-released with the same artwork on the packaging, but without including an action figure. The photographs on the boxes were re-shot using Pro-Tek action figures such as Daryl. Later in the year a fourth new dummy, Ted, was released wearing a black and green suit and coming with a VHS copy of the Incredible Crash Dummies computer animated cartoon.

Generation 4: Crash Dummies Racing & more Pro-Tek (1994)
On the back of the packaging of the two figures released with the special Crash Dummies VHS, were pictures showing figures to be released in the next series of toys (in 1994). These were never publicly released in North America, though North American figures of Slick, Spin, Axel, and Dash with "The Incredible" on card do exist and are ultra rare, they either received a limited regional release, or are unsold factory stock, it is not fully known, but once in a blue moon North American carded figures from North America that were fully ready for retail do appear on eBay. Also complete and incomplete figures from factory stock sealed in plastic bags exist and are collectors pieces. It is unknown how many Darlene, the female dummy, prototypes were made, but they do exist, some finished and some unfinished, unpainted shells. She was intended as a female counterpart to Daryl, and featured breasts, a feminine head with a bow and ribbon, and a pink wrench. Though never released as a figure, she was featured in the board game under the name Darla. In the board game, she did not have a pro-tek suit, but rather a pink suit in the style of the first line of toys.  A pro tek figure of the controversial Skid the Kid with a new stroller was also slated, made it to prototype stage, but it was never released anywhere, and is even rarer than the Darlene prototype. In early 2015 a Crash Dummy collector found a Pro Tek Skid the Kid with his green stroller in an eBay auction and the seller originally found the items in a grab bag at a local thrift store in the U.S.. It can also be seen on the packaging of Ted and Gold Junkman action figures. South America and Europe, had a limited release of some of the items in the line. The line was to continue with the Pro-Tek series, re-introducing characters that had once been included with vehicles from the original line of toys, but their action buttons performed actions previously unseen in the first two lines of figures. In addition, a new line called Crash Dummies Racing was released in small quantities. Racing vehicles and accompanying characters in racing gear were announced but only some ever made it to stores, mostly outside of North America. The true release status of anything from 1994 is almost impossible to determine. Many more ideas had made it to final evaluation but were dropped when Tyco ceased production of the line. Slick, Spin, Dent, and Chip were all released in the racing series line. Three additional figures were set to be released but there is no evidence they were ever put into production. Rod, Gasket, and Axel were seen in very rare advertisements as well as on the back of the Racing series cards. The only known figures are prototypes and are very rare.

The Hot Wheels series 
After purchasing Tyco Toys in 1998, Mattel revived the Crash Dummies line under the Hot Wheels toy brand. The release this time was similar to the original motif: living dummies crash-testing vehicles. The four Dummies were Crash, Crunch, Splice and Gyro. Unlike the first generation, each one suffered damage from crashes in a different way. Crash fell apart like the majority of the original figures, Crunch's head could be bashed into his body, Splice split in two whenever he was involved in a crash, Gyro's upper and lower halves spun in opposite directions. Two others followed the four, Poppa and Flex. Poppa's upper half came of the leg followed by his eyes popping out and Flex bent over backwards.

Related media

Television
In 1993, a half-hour television special called The Incredible Crash Dummies was produced. It was aired on Fox Kids on May 1, 1993. The animated short was entirely composed of computer generated imagery and centered on the adventures of Slick and Spin. A fellow Dummy named Ted has been chosen to use a new, indestructible torso module (Torso-9000), but his head is mixed up with an evil dummy's head, leading to the birth of Junkman. Slick and Spin try to free the kidnapped Dr. Zub from Junkman before the villain can extract the knowledge of how to mass-produce the torso. The special was later released on video and sold with the "Ted" action figure from the special as well as a second edition recolored Junkman.

In 2004, a series of "Crash Dummies" animated shorts were commissioned for the Fox network and produced by 4Kids Entertainment. About a year later after it first aired, the graphics of the shorts were changed. The characters looked slightly darker, while the frame rate of the shorts were slightly slower. In this series, the dummies were named Crash, Splice, Crunch, and Gyro. In the fall of 2005, they were replaced by Teenage Mutant Ninja Turtles shorts.

Video games
 
A video game also called The Incredible Crash Dummies was developed by Gray Matter Inc. and published by LJN, Ltd. in 1993 for the Nintendo Entertainment System and Super NES. The game was ported to numerous systems including the Genesis and Amiga. It was awarded Strangest License of 1992 by Electronic Gaming Monthly. The game received generally negative reviews, with critics commenting that the controls are poor and the novelty factor quickly wears out.

In the 16-bit games, the player takes control of Slick in a story line loosely tied in with the animated movie. The crash dummy is sent on a quest to recover the Torso 9000 and defeat the Junkman. The game adopts a traditional side-scrolling playing style in which each level must be finished from left to right and Junkman's minions defeated along the way. Whenever Slick suffers damage he loses a limb, until he has none left and loses a life. The loss of limbs does not otherwise affect gameplay.  He can recover lost limbs by collecting screwdrivers.

In total there are sixteen levels to complete divided into four areas, each of which must be completed under a specified amount of time. To defend himself, Slick comes equipped with spanners he can throw at his enemies, although their supply is limited. At the end of each area a boss character must be fought and, when successfully completed, a bonus stage can be entered. In the bonus stage the player drives a crash test vehicle and rakes up bonus points as the speed rises.

Master System, Game Boy and Game Gear games of the same name were also created. Unlike the SNES and Genesis games however, these versions put the Dummies in a more traditional role. Every level gave Slick and Spin some variety of dangerous stunt to do, which they would in turn be graded on style. There were 5 levels: jumping off a building, driving a car through a course, skiing down a mountain, sorting bombs in a bomb factory and piloting a spaceship. Once the player had completed these levels, they would repeat numerous times, but with a different layout each time and generally increasing in difficulty, until the player has earned enough money to go on holiday.

Comics

A series of comics involving the Crash Dummies in pro-tek suits was also produced by Harvey Comics in November 1993.

A set of three magazine sized comics were released by Citgo in 1992 featuring the dummies in their original suits. Scattered throughout the comics are various puzzles and games to complete.

The Incredible Crash Dummies Hit the Road to the Auto Race Track (Features Slick, Spin, Daryl, Spare Tire, Dash, Axel, Wack, J.R., Flip)
The Incredible Crash Dummies Hit the Road to the Great Outdoors (Features Slick, Spin, Wack, J.R., Flip)
The Incredible Crash Dummies Hit the Road to the Amusement Park (Features Slick, Spin, Daryl, Spare Tire, Skid the Kid, Hubcat)

Each book is written and illustrated by Tony and Tony Tallarico.

The final page of each book contains four coupons (expired November 1, 1992)

Special Edition CITGO Crash Dummies Figures Mail-In Offer for $4.99 plus S&H
Save $3.00 Mail-In Rebate on Incredible Crash Dummies Crash Test Center
$1.00 Off Mail -In Rebate on Incredible Crash Dummies Crash 'N Bash Chair
Free CITGO Oil Recycling Kit ($2.69 Value)

Each book also features the 'Morgan Shepherd's Pledge For Life' Contest which required kids to mail in a certificate with their information and the signed statement "I pledge to wear my seat belt at all times while riding in an automobile." Contest featured 1,105 winners drawn at random.

Grand Prize (5 Winners) (Expired October 1, 1993)Three night, four day Orlando vacation including accommodations at Buena Vista Palace in the Walt Disney World Village, rental car, Walt Disney World 4 day World Passes, & $500 in spending money
First Prize (100 Winners)$500 in TYCO Toys including Incredible Crash Dummies, radio controlled cars, Little Mermaid & More
Second Prize (1000 Winners)Crash Car with Dash action figure

See also
 Crash Test Dummies, a Canadian rock band also named for their mannequins

References

External links 
History of the Incredible Crash Dummies at X-Entertainment
 - Info on the Super NES video game and all its ports.
 

Action figures
Hot Wheels
Public service announcement characters